Brachystegia kennedyi is a species of plant in the family Fabaceae. It is found in Cameroon and Nigeria. It is threatened by habitat loss.

References

kennedyi
Flora of Cameroon
Flora of Nigeria
Trees of Africa
Vulnerable flora of Africa
Taxonomy articles created by Polbot